The 66th running of the Tour of Flanders cycling classic was held on Sunday, 4 April 1982. Belgian rider René Martens claimed a surprise victory after breaking away solo on the Muur van Geraardsbergen. Eddy Planckaert won the sprint for second at 20 seconds, ahead of Rudy Pevenage. It was by and large Martens' biggest career victory. 51 of 212 riders finished.

Route
The race started in Sint Niklaas and finished in Meerbeke (Ninove) – covering 267 km. There were 11 categorized climbs:

Results

References

External links
 Video of the 1982 Tour of Flanders  on Sporza (in Dutch)

Tour of Flanders
Tour of Flanders
Tour of Flanders
Flanders
Tour of Flanders